Senne Lynen (born 19 February 1999) is a Belgian professional footballer who plays as a midfielder for Union SG in the Belgian Pro League.

Career statistics

Club

References

External links

1999 births
Living people
Belgian footballers
Belgium youth international footballers
Club Brugge KV players
SC Telstar players
Royale Union Saint-Gilloise players
Eerste Divisie players
Belgian Pro League players
Challenger Pro League players
Association football midfielders
Belgian expatriate footballers
Belgian expatriate sportspeople in the Netherlands
Expatriate footballers in the Netherlands
People from Borsbeek
Footballers from Antwerp Province